Benjamin Wickham MacDonald (1853-1920) was a company manager and shipping executive in Queensland, Australia.

Macdonald was once the Russian consul for Queensland.  He became the general manager of the Australasian United Steam Navigation Company and partner in shipping company, Macdonald Hamilton.

MacDonald has been attributed as having influenced the way Queensland's trade and export industry developed.

Awards 
 Queensland Business Leaders Hall of Fame, 2015

References

External links
 Benjamin Wickham Macdonald digital stories and oral history: Queensland Business Leaders Hall of Fame 2015, State Library of Queensland

Australian businesspeople in shipping
1853 births
1920 deaths